Nové Sedlo is a municipality and village in Louny District in the Ústí nad Labem Region of the Czech Republic. It has about 600 inhabitants.

Administrative parts
Villages of Břežany, Chudeřín, Číňov, Sedčice and Žabokliky are administrative parts of Nové Sedlo.

Notable people
Eugen Gura (1842–1906), Austrian opera singer

References

External links

 

Villages in Louny District